Aleksei Andreyevich Igonin (born 18 March 1976) is a former Russian footballer. He has been a Member of the Legislative Assembly of Leningrad Oblast since 2016.

He often appears as a television broadcast analyst for ice hockey and soccer games.

International
He has played for Russia twice in 1998.

References

External links 
 Club profile 
 

1976 births
Footballers from Saint Petersburg
Living people
Russian footballers
Association football midfielders
Russia international footballers
FC Zenit Saint Petersburg players
FC Saturn Ramenskoye players
Russian Premier League players
FC Chornomorets Odesa players
FC Anzhi Makhachkala players
Russian expatriate footballers
Ukrainian Premier League players
Expatriate footballers in Ukraine
FC Zenit-2 Saint Petersburg players
Russian Presidential Academy of National Economy and Public Administration alumni